Pascal Plancque (born 20 August 1963) is a French professional football manager and former player, who was most recently in charge of Nîmes.

Playing career
During a 15-year playing career, Plancque made more than 200 league appearances for four clubs.

Managerial career
Plancque began his managerial career with amateur side Arin Luzien in 1995, and went on to coach Pau and Lille reserves before becoming Boulogne's new manager in 2011. One year later, he was appointed in the managerial role of RC Lens reserves, where he stayed until 2015.

On 30 June 2016, Plancque joined English club Southampton as assistant first team coach to manager Claude Puel. He joined Puel as assistant manager at his next club, Leicester City. However, on 3 August 2018, Plancque left his role at the club.

On 14 January 2019, Plancque took over the vacant managerial position at Chamois Niortais in Ligue 2, following the sacking, despite unexpectedly convincing results of Patrice Lair. After disappointing results, Plancque was relieved of his duties on 5 January 2020.

Honours
Auxerre
Cup of the Alps: 1987

References

External links

1963 births
Living people
People from Cherbourg-Octeville
French footballers
Association football midfielders
Lille OSC players
AJ Auxerre players
Stade Lavallois players
Pau FC players
Ligue 1 players
Ligue 2 players
Championnat National players
French football managers
Pau FC managers
US Boulogne managers
Chamois Niortais F.C. managers
Nîmes Olympique managers
Southampton F.C. non-playing staff
Leicester City F.C. non-playing staff
Ligue 2 managers
Sportspeople from Manche
Footballers from Normandy